Max Besuschkow (born 31 May 1997) is a German professional footballer  who plays as a midfielder for Hannover 96.

Club career
On 25 July 2015, Besuschkow made his debut for VfB Stuttgart II in the 3. Liga against Dynamo Dresden.

On 3 January 2017, Besuschkow joined Bundesliga club Eintracht Frankfurt on a contract until June 2020. In January 2018, he joined 2. Bundesliga side Holstein Kiel on loan for the second half of the season.

On 23 July 2018, Besuschkow was loaned out to Royale Union Saint-Gilloise until June 2020.

International career
Besuschkow played for German under-17 team at the 2014 UEFA European Under-17 Championship.

References

External links
 
 
 
 

1997 births
Living people
Sportspeople from Tübingen
German people of Russian descent
Association football midfielders
German footballers
Germany youth international footballers
VfB Stuttgart II players
VfB Stuttgart players
Eintracht Frankfurt players
Holstein Kiel players
Royale Union Saint-Gilloise players
SSV Jahn Regensburg players
Hannover 96 players
Bundesliga players
2. Bundesliga players
3. Liga players
Regionalliga players
Footballers from Baden-Württemberg